Catorce de Noviembre  is a corregimiento in Río de Jesús District, Veraguas Province, Panama with a population of 787 as of 2010. It was created by Law 58 of July 29, 1998, owing to the Declaration of Unconstitutionality of Law 1 of 1982. Its population as of 2000 was 829.

References

Corregimientos of Veraguas Province